The Erie Panthers were a professional ice hockey team, and one of the founding members in the East Coast Hockey League (ECHL). Based in Erie, Pennsylvania, from 1988 to 1996, they were one of the most prolific teams in the ECHL. The Panthers were known for their ability to score goals quickly and often, as well as for the over-aggressive style of play that led to an abundance of fights. They currently hold records in 15 different categories in the ECHL and are in the top five of 38 different categories.

History
The Panthers were created by Henry Brabham, who was also an intricate part of the creation of the ECHL itself. Erie was chosen as a location due to the success of the former Erie Golden Blades. The Panthers enjoyed success earlier on in their existence with five straight playoff appearances. Though never winning the league championship, the team was named the regular season champs for the 1989–90 season. The next three years would bring about the end of the Panthers franchise with three straight losing seasons.

In 1996, the team would be moved to Baton Rouge, Louisiana and renamed the Baton Rouge Kingfish. There the team's struggles continued, making the playoffs in only one of seven seasons in Baton Rouge. In 2004, the franchise again relocated, this time moving 4,400 miles northwest to Victoria, British Columbia. The franchise continued operation there as the Victoria Salmon Kings, garnering a Division Championship in the 2007–08 season.

The franchise finally ceased operations following the 2010–11 ECHL season, making way for the WHL's Victoria Royals. This marked the end of a 23-year franchise run, the longest in the league behind the Wheeling Nailers (Carolina Thunderbirds) and the Greenville Swamp Rabbits (Johnstown Chiefs), both of which continue to operate.

Jersey and Logos
The Panthers' jerseys were black, white, and grey. The Home jersey had a white background, while the away jersey had a black background. The original logo was that of a grey panther and a hockey stick. During the 1991–92 season, the use of an alternate logo was added. This logo was the face of a growling panther in dark blue. The 1994–95 season saw the last logo change for the Panthers. This logo was a caricature of a panther, under the word "Erie". Also used during the 1994–95 season was a "20th Anniversary of Hockey in Erie" patch.

The Erie Insurance Arena

The home of the Erie Panthers was the newly constructed Civic Center, now known as the Erie Insurance Arena, located in downtown Erie, Pennsylvania. The five-year-old arena held roughly 5,500 fans and served as one of the loudest places to play in the ECHL for eight years. Despite being a fairly new building, the Tullio Arena lacked a proper sound dampening system with the playing surface being surrounded on all sides by uncovered concrete walls. This design allowed the already loud noise of the crowd to be amplified throughout the building.

Coaches
1989–95: Head coach: Ron HansisAsst. Coach: Barry Smith
1995–96: Head coach: Barry Smith

Players
Over the course of the eight seasons in Erie, 225 players suited up for the Panthers, with sixty-eight of those having already been drafted in the NHL Entry Draft or NHL Supplemental Draft. Only three players have played in the NHL after playing for the Panthers.

Former players typically took one of two paths after leaving the team. They either played out their career in European hockey leagues, or joined the Roller Hockey International league.

NHL alumni

Individual Awards
1989 Coach of the Year: Ron Hansis
1989 MVP Award: Daryl Harpe
1989 Leading Scorer: Daryl Harpe
1989 Defenseman of the Year: Kelly Szauter
1990 MVP Award: Bill McDougall
1990 Rookie of the Year: Bill McDougall
1990 Leading Scorer: Bill McDougall
1995 Rookie of the Year: Kevin McKinnon
1995 Leading Scorer: Scott Burfoot

Season by season results

Playoffs
1988–89: Lost to Carolina 4-0 in semifinals.
1989–90: Defeated Hampton Roads 3-2 in quarterfinals; lost to Greensboro 2-0 in semifinals.
1990–91: Lost to Johnstown 3-2 in quarterfinals.
1991–92: Lost to Johnstown 3-1 in first round.
1992–93: Defeated Greensboro 1-0 in first round; lost to Toledo 3-1 in quarterfinals.

Championships
1988–89 Henry Brabham Cup (Regular season points champions)

Team records

League Records
The Erie Panthers are ranked in the Top 5 of 38 categories kept track of by the ECHL. Of those, they are ranked #1 in 15 categories. Below is only a partial list of these records.

See Also: List of Erie Panthers League Records.

Most penalty minutes (Career)
#1: 2,425 - Cam Brown (Chill 91-93, Panthers 93-96, Kingfish 96-02, Gladiators 02-06)

Most goals, both teams (One game)
#1: 21 - Erie Panthers (13) vs. Carolina Thunderbirds (8), Dec. 21, 1988
#2: 20 - Richmond Renegades (15) vs. Erie Panthers (5), Dec. 23, 1990
#3: 19 - Erie Panthers (11) vs. Knoxville Cherokees (8), Mar. 18, 1989

Highest goals-per-game average (One season)
#1: 5.95 - Erie Panthers, 1989-90 (357 goals in 60 games)
#4: 5.45 - Erie Panthers, 1988-89 (327 goals in 60 games)

Fastest three goals
#1: 21 seconds - Doug Stromback (12:19), Daryl Harpe (12:29) and Hank Banas (12:40 of 3rd period),
Erie vs. Knoxville, Nov. 29, 1988

Most penalty minutes, both teams (One game)
#1: 244 - Toledo Storm (124) vs. Erie (120), Mar. 22, 1993

References

General reference
HockeyDB.com
ECHL.com

Defunct ECHL teams
Defunct ice hockey teams in Pennsylvania
Sports in Erie, Pennsylvania
Ice hockey clubs established in 1988
Sports clubs disestablished in 1996
1988 establishments in Pennsylvania
1996 disestablishments in Pennsylvania